Rose Marian Bradley (1867 – 24 September 1948) was an English journalist and writer.

Biography 
On 19 June 1867, Bradley was born in Marlborough, Wiltshire. Bradley's father was George Bradley, Dean of Westminster. 

Bradley contributed to the Cornhill Magazine and The Nineteenth Century. During World War I she was secretary to the Women's Legion, for which she received an O.B.E. She also helped compile the biography of Lord Chaplin.

Works
 Children at Play, and other sketches, 1911
 The English Housewife in the Seventeenth and Eighteenth Centuries, 1912

References

1867 births
1948 deaths
English journalists
English women journalists